The Assistant Secretary of State for Conflict and Stabilization Operations is the head of the Bureau of Conflict and Stabilization Operations within the United States Department of State, supporting the department's conflict and crisis-response efforts. The assistant secretary reports to the Under Secretary of State for Civilian Security, Democracy, and Human Rights.

The first assistant secretary, Rick Barton, was nominated by President Barack Obama on November 29, 2011, and confirmed by the Senate on March 29, 2012.

The current assistant secretary is Anne Witkowsky.

Responsibilities
The Assistant Secretary of CSO is the Secretary of State's senior adviser on instability, conflict, and stabilization. The assistant secretary's responsibilities include:
Formulating and implementing policies on conflict prevention, response, stabilization policies, and programs under the overall direction of and in coordination with the Under Secretary of State for Civilian Security, Democracy, and Human Rights;
Leading the development of a unique brand of conflict prevention and mitigation analysis, programming, and operations in coordination with relevant department bureaus and other agencies;
Working with other U.S. government agencies such as the Department of Defense to strengthen the U.S. government's analysis and planning to conduct operations that prevent political violence, atrocities, and the spread or emergence of violent extremism such as White Supremacy, White Nationalism, Radical Islam, Mafia, etc.
Engaging with the U.S. Congress in coordination with the Bureau of Legislative Affairs on conflict prevention, response, and stabilization capabilities and operations;
Strengthening staff expertise to serve as an early warning, analysis, planning, and monitoring capability for conflict prevention and response for the Atrocities Prevention Board (APB), as well as the department, Chiefs of Mission, and other USG agencies;
Working with relevant partners, including NATO, nongovernmental organizations, foreign governments, international/regional organizations, the private sector, and the public to harmonize civilian and military plans.

List of Assistant Secretaries of State for Conflict and Stabilization Operations

References

External links
Official website

 
2011 establishments in Washington, D.C.